Luzula crinita  is a species of flowering plant in the rush family that is native to the subantarctic islands of New Zealand and Australia.  The specific epithet comes from the Latin crinitus (hairy tufted), with reference to the leaves.

Description
Luzula crinita is a perennial herb growing in stiff, dark green clumps 40–450 mm in height.  The leaves have incurved edges, with long marginal hairs.  The inflorescence is usually a single, rounded, brownish-black head with densely crowded florets and a hairy bracteole margin.  The flowers are 2–2.5 mm long, with six stamens.  The tepals and capsule are dark brown.

Distribution and habitat
The plant is found on New Zealand's Antipodes, Auckland and Campbell Islands, as well as on Australia's Macquarie Island. It grows in Agrostis grassland, in fellfield and along the margins of marshes, from sea level to an altitude of 370 m.  It flowers from October to January.

References

crinita
Flora of the Auckland Islands
Flora of the Antipodes Islands
Flora of Macquarie Island
Flora of the Campbell Islands
Poales of Australia
Plants described in 1844